Pochyta insulana is an endemic jumping spider species of the family Salticidae that lives on the island of Príncipe, São Tomé and Príncipe. It was first named and described in 1910 by Eugène Simon.

Its male holotype measures 5 mm and its female holotype measures from 5.5 to 6 mm.

References

Endemic fauna of Príncipe
Salticidae
Spiders of Africa
Taxa named by Eugène Simon
Spiders described in 1910